Wade Megan (born July 22, 1990) is an American former professional ice hockey center who played in the National Hockey League (NHL) with the St. Louis Blues and the Detroit Red Wings.

Playing career
Originally chosen by the Florida Panthers in the 2009 entry draft, Megan played collegiate hockey with Boston University in the Hockey East. Unable to secure a NHL contract with the Panthers, Megan signed his first professional deal with Florida's AHL affiliate, the San Antonio Rampage to begin the 2013–14 season on September 20, 2013.

After three-years within the Panthers AHL affiliates, Megan left as a free agent and secured his first NHL deal, on a one-year, two-way deal with the St. Louis Blues on July 2, 2016. Upon participating in his first training camp with the Blues, Megan was reassigned to start the 2016–17 season, with the Chicago Wolves. On December 22, 2016, Megan received his first recall to the NHL. He made his NHL debut that night against the Tampa Bay Lightning, becoming the first National Hockey League player from the city of Canton, New York. He scored his first NHL goal in the first period in a 5–2 defeat to the Lightning. He was returned to the Wolves following the game.

On July 1, 2018, the Detroit Red Wings signed Megan as a free agent to a one-year, two-way contract. On October 31, 2018, Megan was recalled by the Red Wings. Prior to being recalled, he recorded two goals and two assists in eight games for the Grand Rapids Griffins.

At the conclusion of his contract with the Red Wings, Megan opted to conclude his six-year professional career retiring to found the NoCo Hockey camp in Canton, New York, working as an instructor alongside fellow Canton former pro Kyle Flanagan and coach Mark Phalon.

Personal
He is the son of former professional hockey player, Ron Megan, who played two seasons in the International Hockey League with the Kalamazoo Wings and Peoria Prancers in 1983 and 84.

Career statistics

Awards and honors

References

External links
 

1990 births
American men's ice hockey centers
Boston University Terriers men's ice hockey players
Chicago Wolves players
Cincinnati Cyclones (ECHL) players
Detroit Red Wings players
Florida Panthers draft picks
Grand Rapids Griffins players
Ice hockey players from New York (state)
Living people
Portland Pirates players
San Antonio Rampage players
St. Louis Blues players
South Kent School alumni